Yankiel León Alarcón (born 26 April 1982 in Jobabo) is a Cuban amateur boxer best known to win Silver at the 2008 Olympics at bantamweight.

Career
Leon won gold at the World Junior Championships in Budapest, Hungary in 2000 as a light flyweight.
became senior national champion 2002 at flyweight then moved up.

At bantam he stood in the shadows of near-invincible two-time Olympic champion Guillermo Rigondeaux who beat him eight times. When Rigondeaux was out injured in 2007 Leon lost at the national championships to Yasniel Toledo.

After it became clear that the banned Rigondeaux would not be sent to Beijing Leon trained harder and beat archrival Toledo and Yurien Fabregas at the nationals 2008.

He lost to local Dominican Claudio Marrero in the first round of the Copa Independencia but breezed through his qualifier easily beating everybody including Marrero and fellow qualifier Oscar Valdez to easily make it to the Olympics.

He holds wins over Yan Bartelemí, Yuriorkis Gamboa and Iván Calderón (PUR) among others.

Olympic Games results
1st round bye
Defeated Kanat Abutalipov (Kazakhstan) 10-3
Defeated Worapoj Petchkoom (Thailand) 10-2
Defeated Bruno Julie (Mauritius) 7-5
Lost final to Enkhbatyn Badar-Uugan 5-16

External links
 
 Nationals 2008
 Qualifier

1982 births
Living people
Bantamweight boxers
Boxers at the 2008 Summer Olympics
Olympic boxers of Cuba
Olympic silver medalists for Cuba
Olympic medalists in boxing
Medalists at the 2008 Summer Olympics
Cuban male boxers
People from Jobabo
AIBA World Boxing Championships medalists
21st-century Cuban people